Horvátzsidány is a small village in Vas County, Hungary. Writer Jakab Szabár was born here.

References

Populated places in Vas County